Line 5 Eglinton (also known as the Eglinton Crosstown or the Crosstown) is a light rail line that is under construction in Toronto, Ontario, Canada. Owned by Metrolinx and operated by the Toronto Transit Commission (TTC), the line will be part of the Toronto subway system as its fifth route. The first phase of the  line will include 25 stops along Eglinton Avenue, from Mount Dennis station underground to  station, after which it will run predominantly at-grade within the street's median to Kennedy station, where it will connect underground with Line 2 Bloor–Danforth and Line 3 Scarborough.

The line was conceived in 2007 during the administration of Toronto mayor David Miller as part of Transit City, a large-scale transit expansion plan. Construction of the first phase of the line began in 2011 and was originally expected to be completed in 2020; it has been delayed more than once, and as of November 2021, Metrolinx and Crosslinx (the construction consortium) agreed on an opening date in late 2022. However, by December 2021, Metrolinx expected the line to be substantially complete by September 2022, but that it would not open to the public until several months later, possibly in 2023. By late September 2022, Metrolinx had conceded the line would not be completed by the end of 2022 but would be ready for service in 2023. , the budgeted cost of the project was $12.82billion. In December 2022, CBC News reported on confidential internal documents, which indicated that Crosslinx had no "credible plan" to complete the line.

Future extensions towards Toronto Pearson International Airport in the west and the University of Toronto Scarborough in the east were approved by Toronto City Council in 2016. In September 2020, assessment and pre-construction of the westward extension to Renforth station was being undertaken by Metrolinx.

History

Background
The origins of Line 5 Eglinton can be traced to the 1985 Network 2011 plan conceived by the Metro Toronto government as the TTC and Metro began to install the busway along Eglinton. It was to be completed by 2003. In 1986, a coalition of City of York and Etobicoke Metro councillors and the Region of Peel persuaded Metro Council to include an Eglinton West line in a new Transit Network Plan. Work on the subway line began in 1994 and was halted following the election in 1995, which saw Mike Harris taking power and led to the cancellation of the Eglinton West line, with the existing tunnel quickly filled in.

Original concept
Line 5 Eglinton was originally conceived as the Eglinton Crosstown LRT, a partially underground light rail line, announced in 2007 by Toronto mayor David Miller and TTC chair Adam Giambrone. It was part of the Transit City plan, which included the implementation of six other light rail lines across Toronto. The original version of the line would have run from Pearson Airport along Silver Dart Drive to Convair Drive. The line would have then turned southwest to a bridge over Highway 401 to reach Commerce Boulevard on the other side, where it would run south to reach Eglinton Avenue and the east end of the Mississauga Transitway. The rest of the line would run east along Eglinton Avenue, including a portion along which the proposed Eglinton West subway line would have been built. The line would then traverse the city, connecting with Line 1 Yonge–University, Line 2 Bloor–Danforth, and Line 3 Scarborough.

There were 43 stops planned for the Eglinton Crosstown LRT, 13 of which would be underground. The line would terminate at Kennedy station to the east in Scarborough where it would meet Line 2 Bloor–Danforth, the proposed Scarborough Malvern LRT and the Stouffville GO train line. The expected cost was billion. As a result of provincial funding cuts, construction of the line was divided into two phases: phase one would end at Jane Street, and phase two would terminate as had been planned at Pearson Airport.

Rob Ford–era redesigns
Miller's successor, Rob Ford, announced the cancellation of Transit City on December 1, 2010, the day he took office. He proposed an alternative titled the "Eglinton–Scarborough Crosstown line", which put the  line along Eglinton Avenue completely underground. The cost would almost double to $8.2billion and, compared to the original plan, 18 fewer stops were planned, including the elimination of the connection to Pearson Airport. Most of the additional cost would have come from putting 12 additional stations underground and for converting the Scarborough RT.

On February 8, 2012, in a special meeting, Toronto City Council, led by Karen Stintz, voted 25–18 to override Mayor Ford's modifications to the project. The vote reinstated the original proposal to only construct the portion between Laird Drive and Keele Street underground while the remainder of the line is built along the surface. On November 30, 2012, the environmental assessment was revised, such that the east tunnel portal location would be moved from east of Brentcliffe to east of Don Mills; however, this was reversed in May 2013 after receiving community feedback. In January 2013, city councillors from Scarborough put forward an alternative plan to proceed with the construction of the Eglinton Avenue portion of the line as planned but to exclude the Scarborough RT from the line. In July 2013, plans for an "Eglinton-Scarborough Crosstown" line were abandoned, thereby reverting the entire line back to the plan that had been conceived under Transit City.

Construction and implementation

Crosslinx
Crosslinx Transit Solutions (CTS), a consortium of more than 26 companies, was awarded the contract to design, build and finance the Eglinton Crosstown line and to maintain it for 30 years. The contract, which excludes boring the tunnels, is for completing all other remaining work, including the stations and the finishing work within the tunnels. Some of the members of the consortium are SNC-Lavalin, Aecon, EllisDon, ACS Infrastructure Canada, Dragados, IBI Group and Scotiabank. The contract defines a public–private partnership.

The 30-year contract to build and maintain the line will total $9.1billion. Capital costs will be $5.3billion, with each of the 15 underground stations costing $80–$100million to build and the ten street-level stops $3–$5million each. The remainder will be for financing, lifecycle and maintenance costs.

In July 2015, the Crosslinx Transit Solutions Maintenance General Partnership consortium awarded Bombardier Transportation a 30-year contract to maintain Line 5's light-rail vehicles. The contract was worth $403million. Bombardier will also maintain wayside systems (track and overhead catenary) for Line 5.

Timeline

2010
On July 28, 2010, Metrolinx ordered four tunnel boring machines (TBMs) from Caterpillar at a cost of $54million. The TBMs were named Dennis, Lea, Humber, and Don. The names were chosen by Jason Paris, a moderator of the UrbanToronto blog and web forums. Dennis is named after Mount Dennis, Lea is named after Leaside, Humber is named after the Humber River, and Don is named after the Don River. The names Dennis and Lea combined allude to the poet Dennis Lee. By the time all four machines reach Yonge Street, enough dirt will have been removed to fill the Air Canada Centre (renamed Scotiabank Arena in 2018) to the height of the CN Tower.

2011
In October 2011, the first part of tunnel construction began with the construction of a launch shaft for tunnel boring machines at Black Creek Drive.

On November 9, 2011, in Keelesdale Park, Mayor Rob Ford and Premier Dalton McGuinty officially broke ground on the new project.

2012
In May 2012, TTC staff released a report saying that completion of the Eglinton Crosstown was unlikely by 2020 and that a more realistic in-service date would be 2022–2023. The main reason given was that the project management had been transferred from the TTC to Infrastructure Ontario which uses the Alternative Finance and Procurement strategy. That strategy would use a private contractor to complete the project, effectively requiring that contractor to redo all design work already completed by the TTC. The TTC also warned that Metrolinx's aggressive timeline would lead to severe construction-related disruptions to communities and traffic because large stretches of the Eglinton Avenue would have to be torn up concurrently to meet deadlines.

2013
In January 2013, Infrastructure Ontario issued a request for qualifications to shortlist companies to construct the line. A request for proposal was expected in mid-2013.

On February 22, 2013, TBMs Dennis and Lea arrived in Keelesdale Park.

In June 2013, the TBMs Dennis and Lea began tunnelling on the line. Traffic on Eglinton Avenue near Keele Street was reduced to one lane in each direction.

On November 12, 2013, Metrolinx awarded a contract to a joint venture between Aecon Group and ACS Dragados Canada to construct the eastern portion of the line between Yonge Street and Laird Drive.

2014
In March 2014, work began to clear utilities and trees on the south side of Eglinton Avenue just east of Brentcliffe Road in order to set up the eastern launch shaft. For two and a half years, traffic around the excavation site will be reduced from two to one lane in each direction. West of the site, more lane restrictions would go into effect to construct head walls (below-ground walls that form the ends of each subway station) at the future Laird, Bayview and Mt. Pleasant stations. There will also be lane restrictions for two years near Hanna Road to build an emergency exit near Leaside High School.

By April 2014, the TBMs had arrived at Caledonia station. In April 2014, The Globe and Mail reported that the two western tunnel boring machines were excavating "approximately 1,000 cubic yards of spoil", per day.

The tunnels are lined with precast concrete liner segments. Six  segments form each ring.

In early December 2014, Dennis and Lea arrived at Eglinton West station. Dennis stopped to allow Lea to catch up, so that they would arrive at Eglinton West station at the same time.

2015

In April 2015, merchants along Eglinton Avenue West were complaining of lost revenue (up to a 35 percent dip in sales), because construction was discouraging customers with snarled traffic, limited parking options, reduced foot traffic and dusty sidewalks.

By September 2015, the TBMs Don and Humber arrived for assembly in the shaft at Brentcliffe Road before starting to drill the  section west to Yonge Street.

On September 24, 2015, Transportation Minister Steven Del Duca issued a statement saying the Crosstown would not operate until September 2021, in order "to mitigate disruption to the local community and infrastructure as much as possible." The earlier plan had been to open in 2020 with tunnelling and station construction to start in 2012. Infrastructure Ontario has awarded the Crosstown construction contract to Crosslinx, a consortium led by SNC Lavalin. It will take about four years to build the stations, 15 of which will be underground.

On September 29, 2015, TBM Don started to bore the north tunnel from the Brentcliffe Road launching site westwards towards Yonge Street. TBM Humber will start boring the south tunnel approximately one month later.

On November 3, 2015, Del Duca announced that the contract awarded to Crosslinx Transit Solutions to complete the Crosstown and maintain it for 30 years will cost $2billion less than originally estimated.

2016

On March 10, 2016, a ground-breaking ceremony was held at the site of Keelesdale station, the first station to be started for construction along the Eglinton Crosstown line.

In February 2016, work began on the extraction shaft for TBMs Humber and Don, which are digging the eastern segment of the line. However, the hole in the street there will be much smaller than the one near Leslie Street.

On April 18, 2016, at the location of the future Forest Hill station, the façade of the former House of Chan restaurant and the scaffolding that was holding it up collapsed, injuring seven people.

On May 10, TBMs Dennis and Lea, which had been boring the western segment of the line, completed their work by reaching Yonge Street. Dennis and Lea bored , installing 25,647 precast concrete tunnel segments to construct the 4,279 rings to line the twin tunnels.

On August 17, TBMs Don and Humber, which had been boring the eastern segment of the line, completed their work by reaching Yonge Street. Don and Humber bored , installing 26,178 precast concrete tunnel segments to construct the 4,363 rings to line the twin tunnels.

On September 1, Bombardier Transportation, which is producing cars for the line, failed to meet the delivery deadline for the pilot vehicle. As a result, Metrolinx filed notice to terminate the contract with Bombardier.

On November 3, 2016, Metrolinx filed a "notice of intention" to cancel its contract with Bombardier for the Crosstown's rolling stock.

2017

On February 10, 2017, Bombardier filed an injunction, seeking to compel Metrolinx to stick with their contract. Metrolinx responded that Bombardier did deliver a prototype for testing, as required by the contract. However, Metrolinx claimed that the prototype was so incomplete that it would not power up.

Between March 13 and 17, the TBMs Don and Humber were removed in pieces from the extraction shaft on Eglinton Avenue just east of Yonge Street.

In July 2017, construction crews began preparation for constructing the eastern at-grade portion of the line by removing the median in the roadway.

On August 9, the first piece of track, a turnout, was installed at the Eglinton Maintenance and Storage Facility (EMSF) in Mount Dennis. The facility was scheduled for completion in late 2018, but construction is now expected to be complete in early 2019.

2018
In July 2018, Crosslinx Transit Solutions, the construction company building the LRT line, sued Metrolinx, claiming that utility work prior to construction exceeded timelines Metrolinx had specified. Crosslinx sought to extend the 2021 deadline for the opening of the transit line by one year. In August 2018, Metrolinx submitted a filing with the Ontario Superior Court of Justice to dismiss the lawsuit. This was based on an agreement with Crosslinx to resolve disputes only after construction has been completed. The lawsuit was settled by Metrolinx in September 2018 under undisclosed terms. It was revealed by the Auditor General of Ontario that one of the terms included an additional $237million to be paid to Crosslinx for an assurance to meet Metrolinx's 2021 deadline.

In October 2018, the Eglinton Maintenance and Storage Facility was substantially complete.

By December 2018,  of track had been installed. The line requires  of track in total.

2019
On January 8, 2019, Bombardier delivered the first Flexity Freedom vehicle to the Eglinton Maintenance and Storage Facility, which, according to Metrolinx, was "substantially complete and ready to receive the vehicles" by this date.

In January 2019, the first concrete pour for the surface section occurred at the location of the future O'Connor stop at Eglinton Square. Before being encased in concrete, conduit pipes were laid to support communications and power cables for the Crosstown's stations and stops.

From July 1 to late August 2019, Leslie Street at Eglinton Avenue was closed for the installation of tracks and infrastructure at the intersection. During this time, the TTC 51 Leslie bus route turned back at Leslie and Eglinton at a temporary bus loop. The temporary closure allowed work to be completed in one section instead of two, thus eliminating joints in the road and track. This provided a higher quality result, reducing future maintenance. The closure also reduced the construction period at the intersection from six months to two.

In November 2019, Crosslinx informed Metrolinx that it expected the line not to be completed before May 6, 2022, and that the construction costs would total $12.58billion, an increase of $330million over previous estimates. The main problems reported were defective caissons (underground watertight compartments) built in the 1950s at Eglinton station, groundwater at the Avenue station site and construction difficulties at the CP Rail bridge adjacent to the Mount Dennis station.

On December 14, 2019, testing began between the Eglinton Maintenance and Storage Facility and the Western portal using Flexity Freedom vehicles, initially testing track clearances at slow speed. On December 17, Crosslinx conducted an inaugural run with staff and guests from the handover platform at the EMSF to the elevated guideway over Black Creek Drive. At that time, overhead wire had been installed between the EMSF to just short of the Keelesdale platform.

2020
As of the end of January 2020, Crosslinx had laid 50 percent of the line's track.

In February 2020, Metrolinx announced that the line would not open until "well into 2022", a delay from the previous target of September 2021. This was despite Metrolinx reaching a settlement with Crosslinx the previous year, paying the consortium $237million to commit to a September 2021 deadline. Metrolinx cited reasons for the delay: Crosslinx had started work nine months late, and had been slow to finalize some aspects of the design. Also, at Eglinton station, pipes embedded in concrete built in the 1950s were discovered in a position that impeded excavation for the Crosstown under Line 1 Yonge–University.

In early March 2020, the provincial government announced it would provide $3million in aid to local merchants negatively affected by Crosstown construction near their businesses. The Ministry of Transportation and Metrolinx also announced that they would look into an earlier, partial opening of the Crosstown line.

By March 2020, Crosslinx had installed the first passenger-waiting shelter on the surface section of the line at the Pharmacy stop. The shelters were pre-fabricated and hoisted into position on the LRT boarding platform.

On March 9, 2020, Crosslinx began work to extract tunnel boring machines Dennis and Lea at Duplex Avenue, one block west of Yonge Street.

On May 4, 2020, Metrolinx reported the first test trip by a light rail vehicle (LRV) in a Line 5 tunnel. The trip was from the maintenance and storage facility to just short of the platform at the underground Keelesdale station.

On October 1, 2020, Crosslinx proposed partially opening Line 5 on February 28, 2022, with the Line 5 portion of Eglinton station not opening until May 2022. However, the direct connection for riders transferring between Lines 1 and 5 at Eglinton station would not be completed until September 2022; until then, passengers who wished to transfer would need to exit to the surface and descend by the entrance next door. Crosslinx says defective infrastructure from 1954 at Eglinton station, difficult hydrogeological conditions and the COVID-19 pandemic had hindered the project. Moody's Investors Service also reported delays at Kennedy, Forest Hill, Mount Pleasant and Cedarvale stations. On October 8, Crosslinx filed a lawsuit against Metrolinx and Infrastructure Ontario, claiming $134million in unexpected costs due to the pandemic. Metrolinx countered that Crosslinx had been falling behind schedule before the pandemic.

In early December 2020, the first pieces of artwork were being installed at Science Centre and Mount Dennis stations.

2021
By early April 2021, tracks had been laid on the surface into the Brentcliffe Portal just east of Brentcliffe Road. This location will be the transition between underground and surface running on Line 5 between Laird station and the Sunnybrook Park stop. In addition, as of April 2021, 85 percent of track had been installed along the entire line.

In April 2021, the last concrete "invert pour" on the line was completed at Eglinton station. The invert pour created the station's base level slab (also called an "invert"), which lies over the "mudslab", a concrete layer that sits on top of the earth.

On May 3, 2021, Crosslinx energized the overhead catenary system between Laird and Kennedy stations for testing purposes. Traction power substations along the surface route supply electricity to the catenary; there will be 15 such substations.

On May 17, 2021, Crosslinx won a case in Ontario Superior Court against Metrolinx and Infrastructure Ontario to allow compensation for the extra construction costs and project delays due to the pandemic. The court decision allowed Crosslinx to negotiate with the two provincial agencies for financial compensation and a later completion date. (The completion per the contract was to have been September 2021, later revised to 2022 by Metrolinx.) Crosslinx sought approximately $134million in compensation for extra safety measures, absenteeism and supply-chain problems due to the COVID-19 pandemic.

Between May 25 and June 2, 2021, six LRVs were delivered by truck from the Eglinton Maintenance and Storage Facility to Eglinton Avenue East and Rosemount Drive along the eastern end of the line. After unloading, each LRV (powered by the catenary) ran westwards to be stored within the Brentcliffe portal. (Until this point, only the section west from Caledonia station had been operational for testing trains.) Clearance and static testing was scheduled to take place in June with LRVs moving at walking speed.

Effective June 20, 2021, the TTC renumbered the Avenue Rd bus route from 5 to 13 in order to free up the route number 5 for the Eglinton line.

By July 2021, 93 percent of the rail had been installed along the line. At Chaplin station, track work was being completed. However, at neighbouring Avenue station, concrete was still being poured in the tunnel at one end of the station box.

Until late August 2021, Crosslinx had tested the interaction between the vehicles and communications and signal systems east of the Brentcliffe portal. Vehicles ran at slow speeds. On August 24, 2021, Crosslinx started a new phase of testing east of the Brentcliffe portal involving coupled vehicles, increased speed, braking and concurrent vehicle operation.

By early October 2021, Crosslinx was finishing the trackwork at Eglinton station, which included a crossover. By November 1, 2021, the last section of track was laid under Yonge Street at Eglinton station, making the rails continuous between Mount Dennis and Kennedy stations. Full completion of the catenary, signals and the communication system was not expected until 2022.

In November 2021, an LRV travelled from the EMSF to Laird station under its own power at slow speed in order to test clearances and systems along the way; the section between Laird and Fairbank stations had limited power. Then, the three coupled pairs of LRVs stored at Laird station were driven back to the EMSF for maintenance and replaced by two trains for further testing of the line east of Laird station.

By December 2021, Metrolinx and Infrastructure Ontario had come to a settlement with Crosslinx to pay the consortium an extra $325million to handle additional costs due the COVID-19 pandemic and due to an unexpected obstruction at Eglinton station that was impeding construction. The line was expected to be substantially complete by September 2022 but possibly not be open until 2023.

2022

By late February 2022, the last signal to control LRT train movements along the line was installed in the tunnel at Laird station.

In March 2022, Metrolinx announced that all 76 of the light rail vehicles had been brought together at the Eglinton Maintenance and Storage Facility, the fleet's final deliveries having arrived in 2021.

In July 2022, Metrolinx started to test three-car trains together with the train control system along the line. Three-cars is the maximum train length for the line and can carry up to 490 passengers.

In late September 2022, Metrolinx announced that Crosslinx was behind schedule and thus Line 5 would not be completed by year-end as was previously expected. Metrolinx did not provide a revised completion date. However, CBC Toronto cited an unnamed source with knowledge of the project who stated that Line 5 would likely be delayed a year, until September 2023. The completion of underground stations was behind schedule, particularly at Eglinton station where tunnelling under Line 1 was difficult.

According to an internal Metrolinx report from September 2022, Crosslinx had expected to complete the project by March 2023, but Metrolinx felt that date to be unrealistic. Metrolinx blamed Crosslinx and old infrastructure at Eglinton station for project delays. Metrolinx also had complaints about deficiencies in work completed. Crosslinx had over $260million in outstanding claims against Metrolinx.

In December, CBC Toronto obtained confidential documents from Metrolinx which indicated that the company did not believe Crosslinx had a "credible plan" to complete the line. The records stated that 98 percent of construction and engineering work was completed at the time of their writing, while only 79 percent of track and train testing had been completed.

Unique station names
In the planning stages for Line 5 Eglinton, many stations and stops were given working names identical or similar to names of existing subway stations or GO Transit stations within Toronto. On November 23, 2015, a report to the TTC Board recommended giving a unique name to each station within the subway system, including those on Line 5. Thus, several stations with non-unique working names were renamed, even those which will be comparatively simple on-street surface stops: Weston (renamed Mount Dennis), Keele (Keelesdale), Dufferin (Fairbank), Bathurst (Forest Hill), Oriole Park (Avenue), Bayview (Leaside), Leslie (Sunnybrook Park), Don Mills (Science Centre), Victoria Park (O'Connor) and Warden (Golden Mile). Despite its unique name, Eglinton West station will be renamed Cedarvale to avoid confusion with Eglinton station. Eglinton station is not expected to be renamed "Eglinton–Yonge" (as was the case with Sheppard–Yonge station, which was named "Sheppard" before Line 4 Sheppard opened) given that Eglinton station is located in the former village of Eglinton. Alternate names for stations along the under-construction western extension at cross streets (Kipling Avenue, Islington Avenue, Royal York Road, and Jane Street) with existing stations on Line 2 Bloor–Danforth have not yet been announced.

Route

Right-of-way

A short portion of the line across the Black Creek valley will be elevated, between Mount Dennis and Keelesdale stations. The right-of-way will have  of track, including six double crossovers, five mono-directional crossovers and three pocket tracks.

Parts of the surface route will use "green track", that is, track with vegetation growing beside and between the rails. Green track will be used between the Brentcliffe Road tunnel portal (western end of the surface route) and Birchmount Road (Birchmount stop in the east end) with paved gaps at intersections, surface stops and the underground Science Centre station. Each section of green track will have irrigation chambers, a water supply, and an energy source for the irrigation system. Green track will dampen train sounds, absorb runoff water, reduce ambient temperatures in summer and minimize the spread of dust.

Surface stops will be located at accessible, signalized intersections, and will have a transparent design for passenger security. Platforms will have a sign post bearing the stop's name, a barrier along the road to protect waiting passengers, Presto machines, screens displaying the next vehicle arrival time, platform illumination and covered waiting shelters with benches and a passenger assistance intercom. The platforms will be designed for level boarding.

Stations and stops

Public art

As part of the Crosstown project, six stations along Line 5 EglintonMount Dennis, Caledonia, Cedarvale (Eglinton West), Eglinton, Science Centre and Kennedywill feature eight artworks. These stations were chosen because they are all interchange stations expected to host higher passenger volumes. Some of the other stations feature photographs, such as pick-up sticks at Oakwood station.

All artworks will be integrated into station design and construction rather than being stand-alone pieces. Because of the controversy over the artwork LightSpell at Pioneer Village station, in which commuters can display messages that can violate the 2009 revision of TTC's By-Law No. 1 that prohibits the use of inappropriate language, none of the Line 5 artworks will be interactive. The art budget is about $10million. About $1million of that budget will be used for digital art to appear on screens at stations along the line.

Operations

Operating characteristics of the line include:
 There will be three types of train control on the line. Automatic train control (ATC) without a driver onboard is used within the Eglinton Maintenance and Storage Facility. In the underground segment between Mount Dennis and Laird stations, a driver will operate train doors and push a button to depart a station, with ATC controlling the train until the next station. Between Laird and Kennedy stations, the driver controls all train functions.
 On the surface, the line will have dedicated right-of-way transit lanes separate from regular traffic and usage of priority signalling at intersections to ensure certainty in travel times – unlike the streetcars in downtown Toronto or on St. Clair Avenue.
However, actual speed is determined by the spacing of the stops and the dwell times at stops.
 The projected ridership of the line is 5,400 passengers per hour in the peak direction by 2031, but the capacity of the vehicles is 15,000 passengers per hour per direction.
 The surface section of the line will run on a proof-of-payment system but the underground stations will have subway-type fare gates and staff; Presto cards will be available for use across the entire line.
 Metrolinx requires 76 Flexity Freedom LRVs to operate the line.
 Annual operating and maintenance costs are estimated to be $80million upon opening of the line. However, fare revenue and the costs saved by eliminating Eglinton bus service would result in a net annual cost of $39million.
 There will a total of 12 crossovers along the line to reverse LRT trains—seven at underground stations and five on the surface section. Avenue and Laird stations will also have a storage track (with Laird having both) that trains can enter and exit in either direction. The storage tracks will accommodate a train in case of an emergency or change in service as well as allowing for a change of direction.
 Line 5 will use a guideway intrusion detection system (GIDS) to detect trespassers on the tracks on the underground sections of the line. When GIDS detects a trespasser on the tracks, it will issue an audio warning to the trespasser, provide live CCTV video to central control, and automatically stop the train without driver intervention. Each station will have ten GIDS scanners, five on each side of the platform. There will also be GIDS scanners at each tunnel portal. In addition, there will be three scanners within the yellow tactile strips at each platform edge to issue an audio warning if a person steps on it before the train has arrived.

Rolling stock

As the line is owned by the province of Ontario, Metrolinx chose the Bombardier Flexity Freedom light rail vehicle, which uses standard gauge rather than the TTC's own slightly larger gauge. Metrolinx wanted to avoid using a custom gauge in order to secure a better price from the manufacturer and to create a standard for other light-rail projects in the province. The vehicles have an operator's cab at only one end of the vehicle; thus, the LRVs must be run in back-to-back coupled pairs. Trains will use automatic train control within the tunnelled portion of the line. Like the Flexity Outlook vehicles Bombardier built for the TTC's streetcar system, initial work building the chassis was performed at Bombardier's Mexican plant in Ciudad Sahagún, Hidalgo, with final assembly at Bombardier's plant in Thunder Bay.

In 2010, Metrolinx had ordered 182 Flexity Freedom vehicles not only for Line 5 but for other light-rail projects in Ontario. The first two deliveries were expected in the second quarter of 2015 but had not arrived by May 2017. After being unsure if a timely delivery of the Bombardier vehicle order could be relied upon, Metrolinx reduced the Bombardier order from 182 to 76 to supply just Line 5 and made a contingency order with Alstom for 61 Citadis Spirit vehicles, of which 44 would be for Line 5 and the remaining 17 for Line 6 Finch West. If the Flexity order did arrive after all, surplus Alstom vehicles would be used on other Metrolinx projects (most likely the Hurontario LRT in Mississauga in Peel Region). On October 30, 2018, Bombardier announced that the first Flexity Freedom vehicle had completed its in-house testing and would be delivered for on-site testing in Toronto in November 2018. However, the first vehicle arrived late, on January 8, 2019. As a commissioning test, each vehicle must travel  before accepting passengers.

Eglinton Maintenance and Storage Facility

A maintenance and storage facility is required for Line 5, given the new technology employed, track gauge and the number of vehicles ordered. The Eglinton Maintenance and Storage Facility will have storage for 162 Flexity Freedom LRT vehicles and have extensive maintenance facilities to keep them running smoothly. The facility is being built near the line's western terminus at Mount Dennis station on lands formerly occupied by Kodak's Toronto campus and near the Mount Dennis bus garage.

Extensions
Under Mayor John Tory, Toronto City Council approved two extensions for Line 5 Eglinton, to the east and to the west, on March 31, 2016. The Eglinton West LRT is a Metrolinx project under construction. The Eglinton East LRT is a City of Toronto project still in the proposal stage. However, the Eglinton East LRT has become a proposal for a separate line rather than an extension of Line 5.

Eglinton West LRT

Surface station plan (2007–2019)
In a later phase, Metrolinx had planned for the Eglinton Crosstown to be extended westwards from Mount Dennis along Eglinton Avenue West to Toronto Pearson International Airport. However, during the 2014 Toronto mayoral election, John Tory proposed SmartTrack, which would have included a heavy rail transit line established along this section of Eglinton Avenue. In 2016, the City of Toronto released a feasibility report that found this proposal would have significant capital costs ranging from $3.6billion to $7.7billion. In comparison, extending the Eglinton Crosstown as approved would cost $1.3billion. It was also found that a light rail transit line would attract higher ridership than a heavy rail line.

The City of Toronto's chief planner recommended the extension of the Eglinton Crosstown line (referred to as Crosstown West) to Pearson Airport in lieu of establishing SmartTrack on Eglinton Avenue, based upon negative community impacts, higher costs, and lower projected ridership associated with a heavy rail corridor. On January 19, 2016, Tory agreed with the analysis and supported Metrolinx's original plan of extending the Crosstown. Tory included the Crosstown West as a light-rail component of his SmartTrack plan.

In June 2016, the estimated completion date was 2023. The estimated cost to build the Eglinton West LRT was $2.47billion of which the City of Toronto would contribute $1.18billion, the federal government would contribute $822.9million, and the City of Mississauga and the Greater Toronto Airports Authority (GTAA) would be asked to contribute $470million for the portion of the line in Mississauga. Approvals for the financing were still to be secured as of November 2, 2016.

Public meetings for the extension, renamed the Eglinton West LRT, began November 13, 2017.

The 2010 Environmental Assessment for Transit City originally considered an entirely at-grade light rail line running west from Weston Road and Mount Dennis station. However, by October 2017, the City was considering grade separation using fly-overs and fly-unders at six intersections: Martin Grove Road, Kipling Avenue, Islington Avenue, Royal York Road, Scarlett Road, and Jane Street, with surface running between stations.

On November 21, 2017, city staff recommended just 10 stops along Eglinton West between Mount Dennis station and Renforth station on the Mississauga Transitway. The most recent recommendation dropped the stops at Rangoon, East Mall, and Russell / Eden Valley.

At a City executive committee meeting on November 28, 2017, city staff recommended building the extension without any grade separation. City staff had concluded that a fully at-grade extension would provide better access for transit users and have fewer environmental impacts. Grade separation would have little improvement on traffic because the at-grade option would use signal coordination; however, grade separation would require fewer restrictions on left turns. There would be no difference in development potential with either option. However, because of feedback from the public and local politicians, Mayor John Tory recommended more study on grade separation. A fully at-grade extension was estimated to cost $1.5 to $2.1billion. Grade separation would add an extra $881.9million to $1.32billion to that cost.

Grade-separated station plan (2019–present)
In April 2019, Ontario premier Doug Ford, the brother of former Toronto mayor Rob Ford, announced a plan for transit in the Greater Toronto Area. This included the planned extension of Line 5 Eglinton west to Pearson Airport with a section of the line built underground from Royal York to Martin Grove. In February 2020, Metrolinx released an initial business case analysis of the project with four options, including three which were below-grade. Metrolinx ultimately decided on a mostly grade-separated line with seven stations (four underground, two elevated, one at ground level).

The decision to run trains above ground near the proposed station at Jane Street led to protests from late 2022 and the erection of a teepee and other structures from early February 2023. As of that month, the coalition was asking Metrolinx to pause development until a resolution was found. The group also requested more "transparency about the projectits costs, its size, and its impact".

Building a mostly grade-separated extension is expected to cost $4.7billion and would have 7 stations and an estimated 37,000 daily boardings. For comparison, a surface line would have cost $2.9billion and have had 10 ground-level stations and an estimated 42,500 daily boardings. Travel time savings on an underground line would be double that for a surface line, but the reduction in stations would lead to a lower estimated ridership, though local bus service would be retained. During the 2018 Ontario provincial election, Liberal and Progressive Conservative candidates Yvan Baker and Kinga Surma supported the underground option. Of the three major parties, only NDP candidate Erica Kelly supported the less expensive, higher ridership option. Doug Ford, campaigning to become the premier of Ontario, preferred underground construction.

Extension description
The extension will run  from Weston Road to Renforth Drive, just beyond the city limits in Mississauga, serving seven new stations. West of Mount Dennis, the line would emerge from a tunnel and become elevated for stops at Jane Street and Scarlett Road and in order to cross the Humber River. It would travel underground between Royal York Road and Martin Grove Road. The line would then come to the surface for a stop at Renforth station.

For turning back trains, there will be crossovers on the west side of Jane station and on the east side of Renforth station. When the line is extended further west to the airport, there will be an additional crossover on the west side of Renforth station. Both Jane and Renforth stations will have pocket tracks. The delivery strategy from Metrolinx and Infrastructure Ontario includes 5 separate contracts: a first advance tunnel between Renforth Drive and Scarlett Road; a second advance tunnel between Jane Street and Mount Dennis Station; an elevated guideway between Scarlett Road and Jane Street; stations, rail and systems for the entire LRT; and the airport segment.

Advance tunnel 1 – Renforth to Scarlett

In May 2021, the consortium West End Connectors was awarded the contract to design, build and finance the tunnels for the extension, permitting the consortium to set up the tunnel launch site at Renforth Drive and Commerce Boulevard. West End Connectors is a consortium of companies that includes Aecon Infrastructure Management, Dragados Canada, Ghella Canada, TYPSA, EXP Services, Dr. G. Sauer & Partners, Pedelta Canada, ACS Infrastructure Canada, Aecon Concessions, Scotiabank Capital and Ghella Investments & Partnerships. There will be another tunnelled section starting a few hundred metres east of Jane Street, but this work will be part of a separate contract.

On April 11, 2022, tunnelling began from the launch shaft located adjacent to Renforth station; two tunnel-boring machines (TBM), dubbed Rexy and Renny, will tunnel  eastwards to the west side of Scarlett Road, where the extraction shaft will be located. The tunnels will be  underground. The underground stations will be built using the cut and cover method. Renny started boring in April 2022 but Rexy started later, in early August, as the launch area was only big enough to launch one TBM at a time. The extraction shaft will be near the west side of Scarlett Road.

Elevated guideway – Scarlett to Jane
In December 2021, Metrolinx issued a pre-qualification request for a design–build contract on the  elevated guideway from the portal west of Scarlett Road to the portal east of Jane Street. On April 27, 2022, Metrolinx announced that 3 bidders had been shortlisted to respond to a request for proposals: Aecon, EllisDon, and Dragados & Amico.

Advance tunnel 2 – Jane to Mount Dennis
On December 2, 2021, Metrolinx and Infrastructure Ontario issued the request for qualification (RFQ) and shortlisted 2 bidders in the RFP release: Strabag and Acciona & GFL Construction. The contract was expected to be awarded in the second quarter of 2023.

Stations, rails and systems
As of December 2022, an RFP had yet to be issued.

Airport segment
A later phase of the extension would run north along Commerce Boulevard to an elevated bridge, which would carry the line over Highway 401. The line would become elevated again for a stop at Convair Drive, serving the GTAA headquarters and the aircraft and airfield maintenance areas, then at-grade for a stop at Silver Dart Drive, serving some car rental facilities. The rest of the route to Pearson had not been finalized as of 2020, but the line was intended to terminate at the proposed Pearson Regional Transit Centre located north of Pearson Airport Terminals 1 and 3.

Eglinton East LRT

The Eglinton East LRT (EELRT) is a proposed  light-rail line extending from Kennedy station to Malvern Town Centre via Eglinton Avenue East, Kingston Road and Morningside Avenue. Unlike Line 5 Eglinton and the Eglinton West LRT, which are Metrolinx projects, the EELRT is a City of Toronto project. , the plan is that the EELRT be a separate line rather than an extension of Line 5: both the EELRT and Line 5 Eglinton would terminate at Kennedy station rather than operating as one continuous line.

, the estimated cost of the EELRT is $3.9billion with an expected opening in the early to mid-2030s. A ten-percent design and a revised cost estimate are expected in the third quarter of 2023.

EELRT description
Kennedy station would be the western terminus of the EELRT, where there would be passenger connections to Line 2 Bloor–Danforth, Line 5 Eglinton and GO Transit's Stouffville line. It would be located at grade and off street on the south side of Eglinton Avenue and on the east side of the Stouffville line. From Kennedy station, the line would enter a reserved centre median on Eglinton Avenue between Town Haven Place and Midland Avenue. Running east on Eglinton Avenue East, the EELRT would pass Eglinton GO Station before turning northeast on Kingston Road and passing Guildwood GO Station. At Morningside Avenue, the line would turn north to Ellesmere Avenue where there would be connections to the planned Durham–Scarborough bus rapid transit corridor. At Ellesmere Avenue, the line would jog onto the University of Toronto Scarborough campus before returning to Morningside Avenue. The line would continue north to Sheppard Avenue East, then west on Sheppard Avenue to Malvern Road, then north to terminate at Malvern Town Centre. The plan also foresees a future branch of the line on Sheppard Avenue going west from Malvern Road to McCowan Road, where there would be a connection to the Scarborough Subway Extension (SSE) on Line 2. There would also be a short branch on Sheppard Avenue from Morningside Avenue east to Conlins Road to provide access to a proposed maintenance and storage facility.

The EELRT would use its own distinct vehicles (i.e. different from those used on Line 5 Eglinton) in order to better adapt to the line's conditions: no running in tunnels, shorter trains and platforms, and a better ability to climb grades to avoid expensive road infrastructure changes.

EELRT history
In 2016, to complement the Scarborough Subway Extension (SSE), the planned extension of Line 2 Bloor–Danforth to Scarborough Town Centre, the City of Toronto drafted a plan to extend Line 5 Eglinton farther east into Scarborough to terminate at the University of Toronto Scarborough campus.

The extension would add 18 new stops east of Kennedy station and serve an estimated 43,400 additional riders per day (a ridership similar to that of the Line 4 Sheppard subway).

The extension would follow the alignment of the Scarborough Malvern LRT, which was proposed as part of Transit City. In 2010, the Scarborough Malvern LRT was cancelled by Mayor Rob Ford, despite having been approved by Toronto City Council and the Government of Ontario in 2009.

In early 2016, the plan for the Scarborough Malvern LRT was revived and rebranded as "Crosstown East" before being renamed again to "Eglinton East" in 2017. , the project was mostly unfunded, with the cost estimated at $1.6billion to $1.7billion, with an estimated completion date of 2023.

At a November 2017 public meeting, city staff presented the possibility of extending the Eglinton East LRT by six stops to Malvern Town Centre. The extension to Malvern Town Centre would have seven stops: at Pan Am Drive, Sheppard/Morningside, Brenyon Way, Murison Boulevard, Sheppard/Neilson, Wickson Trail, and Malvern Town Centre.

In April 2019, Ontario premier Doug Ford announced a plan for Toronto rapid transit which included the Eglinton West LRT, the Scarborough Subway Extension, the Yonge North Extension and the Ontario Line. The Eglinton East LRT was noticeably not included and was left off the accompanying map. , the City of Toronto and the TTC were in the process of implementing bus-only lanes from Kennedy station to the University of Toronto Scarborough campus via Eglinton Avenue, Kingston Road and Morningside Avenue as part of the RapidTO bus rapid transit scheme, which approximates the route of the Eglinton East LRT. The lanes were anticipated to be fully installed and operational by that November. As well as "red carpet" bus lanes, bus stops were also consolidated to approximately the same configuration and frequency of proposed LRT stations, with certain lower-order curbside stopssuch as those at Huntington Avenue, Brimley Road, Oswego/Barbados Roads and Torrance Avenuebeing removed entirely.

In December 2020, the City of Toronto announced changes to the Eglinton East LRT proposal. The tunnel portal would be extended eastwards to Huntington Avenue due to changes in the Scarborough Subway Extension project, which involved modifying the depth of the tunnel as well as adding a third subway track for service improvements. A station at Midland Avenue was moved underground as a result. A new maintenance and storage facility north of the University of Toronto Scarborough was added to the plan as a result of the Sheppard East LRT cancellation. Originally, both the Eglinton East LRT and the Sheppard East LRT were to have shared a maintenance and storage facility at Conlins Road east of Sheppard and Morningside. The other aspects of the project remained the same, including a tunnel under Kingston Road and Morningside Avenue due to traffic congestion at the Kingston/Lawrence and Morningside area.

The Government of Ontario announced funding for various public transit projects in 2019, but none of the announced funding was earmarked for the EELRT. However, since the province had agreed to fully fund the Scarborough Subway Extension, Mayor John Tory requested in 2021 that the $1.2billion the city had accumulated for that project be redirected to the Eglinton East line.

In 2020, Toronto City Council had approved the concept of the EELRT being an extension of the Metrolinx-owned Line 5 Eglinton. Thus, city staff proposed a "distinct-service concept" for the EELRT. Doing so would result in lower construction costs, a shorter construction period, fewer private property impacts and design flexibility. With this flexibility, the EELRT would not need to conform to Line 5's technology, operations, and maintenance requirements. The city could choose another type of light-rail vehicle and would use the Conlins Yard as the line's maintenance and storage facility. Previously considered tunnels between Kennedy station and Midland Avenue and under Kingston Road would be replaced by surface alignments.

A July 2022 TTC report referred to the standalone line "Line 7 Eglinton East".

See also
 Jane LRT
 Light rail in Canada

References

External links

 Eglinton Crosstown, official project website for the line east of Mt. Dennis
 Eglinton Crosstown West Extension, official project website for the extension west of Mt. Dennis
 Toronto Light Rail Transit projects (Metrolinx)
 

5
Metrolinx
Light rail in Canada
Transit City
Proposed public transport in the Greater Toronto Area
The Big Move projects
750 V DC railway electrification
Public–private partnership projects in Canada
Tram and light rail transit systems under construction
Buildings and structures under construction in Canada
2023 in rail transport
Rapid transit lines in Canada
Standard gauge railways in Canada